Luis García (born 22 August 1934) is a Venezuelan foil and sabre fencer. He competed at the 1960 and 1968 Summer Olympics.

References

External links
 

1934 births
Living people
Venezuelan male foil fencers
Olympic fencers of Venezuela
Fencers at the 1960 Summer Olympics
Fencers at the 1968 Summer Olympics
Venezuelan male sabre fencers
People from Bolívar (state)
20th-century Venezuelan people